Baeotus aeilus, the Amazon beauty, is a species of butterfly of the family Nymphalidae. It is found in the upper Amazon areas of Brazil, Ecuador and Peru.

The wingspan is about 75 mm. Adults are sexually dimorphic. The upperside of the males is dark brown with a broad median band of reflective pale blue scales, while the upperside of the females is banded with pale orange.

Taxonomy
This species was formerly known as Baeotus amazonicus.

References

Coeini
Nymphalidae of South America
Lepidoptera of Brazil
Lepidoptera of Ecuador
Fauna of the Amazon
Butterflies described in 1780
Taxa named by Caspar Stoll